Torodora epiphorana is a moth in the family Lecithoceridae. It was described by Kyu-Tek Park in 2002. It is found in Thailand.

The wingspan is 15–16 mm. The forewings have a conspicuous blackish spot and two small spots near the upper and lower angles. There is an ill-defined yellowish costal patch at three-fourths. The hindwings are grey.

Etymology
The species name refers to the oblique median line of the forewings and is derived from Greek epiphor (meaning slanting).

References

Moths described in 2002
Torodora